Josephine Langley, or Madame Langley, Lady Ventriloquist, was the stage name of Annie Howarth, an English ventriloquist, who performed in music halls. She learned the skill of ventriloquy from her brother James Langley, and first performed at Sunday School concerts in her home town of Burnley, at the age of twelve. She was subsequently managed by her husband, Edward Howarth (known as "Ned").

In 1929 the couple emigrated to the United States, with their young son. They subsequently returned to England.

Her grandson is the artist, John Yeadon, who features her ventriloquist dummies in his work.

Further reading 

  (Maurice Howarth is her son)

References 

Ventriloquists
British emigrants to the United States
Music hall performers
People from Burnley